Electrician's Mate (abbreviated as EM) is a  United States Navy and United States Coast Guard occupational rating. The Electrician's Mate's NOS is B210.

History
The Navy Electrician rating was established in 1883, then promptly disestablished in 1884, only to be re-established as a Navy rating in 1898. The Electrician rating changed to its current name, Electrician's Mate, in 1921.

Duties
Electrician's Mates stand watch on generators, switchboards, control equipment and electrical equipment; operate and perform organizational and intermediate maintenance on power and lighting circuits, electrical fixtures, motors, generators, voltage and frequency regulators, controllers, distribution switchboards and other electrical equipment; test for short circuits, ground or other casualties; and rebuild electrical equipment, including solid state circuitry elements, in an electrical shop.

Requirements
A pre-qualified and selected group of Electrician's Mates attend the Naval Nuclear Power Training Command and then are employed onboard nuclear-powered ships and submarines to maintain the control of electrical systems and subsystems for nuclear reactors.

Electrician's Mate class "A" school is approximately 18 weeks long, and the school is located in Great Lakes, Illinois. The EM rating requires a 5-year minimum enlistment contract. The Nuclear Electrician's Mate (EMN) "A" school is located in Goose Creek, South Carolina. This training is 6 months long, and is followed by an additional 6-month "Power" school, then 6 months of "Prototype" operational reactor time continued in Goose Creek or in Ballston Spa, New York. The EMN rating requires a minimum 6-year enlistment contract.

The Armed Services Vocational Aptitude Battery minimum scores required for the conventional EM rating must be 50 and are the sum of:
Sum of word knowledge and paragraph comprehension
Arithmetic reasoning 
Mathematics knowledge 
Mechanical comprehension

See also
List of United States Coast Guard ratings
List of United States Navy ratings

References

General
https://web.archive.org/web/20110722214824/https://www.cool.navy.mil/enlisted/rating_info_cards/em.pdf

United States Navy ratings
United States Coast Guard job titles
Electrical trades